Sarpa Lake is a lake of Kalmykia in south-western Russia's Volgograd Region. It covers an area of 42.6 square kilometres.

Lakes of Kalmykia